Carolyn Campbell Mase (18801949) was an American painter born in Matteawan, New York, best known for her Impressionist landscapes.

Life
She studied painting with John Henry Twachtman. She had developed into a well established artist by 1912.

She was raised in Beacon, New York, where the fire station is named after her father, Willard H. Mase.  After finishing school in Beacon, Ms. Mase and her friend and contemporary, Alice Judson, traveled to France to study painting where they were influenced by the Impressionists of the day: Renoir, Manet and Monet. "Ms. Mase's style  lent itself well to the subject matter of the Hudson River and its Highlands...radically changing the images from the precise Hudson River School technique to the softer impressionism then gaining influence abroad."

Armory Show of 1913
Mase was one of the artists who exhibited at the Armory Show of 1913, which included one of her pastels entitled September Haze ($100).

Reception 
On May 1, 1929, Vassar Quarterly labeled her art as "delicate color and impressionistic technique".

References

American women painters
People from Beacon, New York
Artists from New York (state)
Pastel artists
1880 births
1949 deaths
20th-century American painters
20th-century American women artists